Ted Cox may refer to:
Ted Cox (American football) (1903–1989), American football coach
Ted Cox (baseball) (born 1955), American baseball player

See also
Edward Cox (disambiguation)